Marion-Crittenden County Airport  is a public use airport located one nautical mile (2 km) southwest of the central business district of Marion, a city in Crittenden County, Kentucky, United States. It is owned by  the Marion-Crittenden County Airport Board. This airport is included in the National Plan of Integrated Airport Systems for 2011–2015, which categorized it as a general aviation facility.

Facilities and aircraft
Marion-Crittenden County Airport covers an area of 150 acres (61 ha) at an elevation of 650 feet (198 m) above mean sea level. It has one runway designated 7/25 with an asphalt surface measuring 4,400 by 75 feet (1,341 x 23 m).

For the 12-month period ending August 22, 2012, the airport had 3,000 aircraft operations, an average of 250 per month: 66.7% general aviation, 16.7% air taxi, and 16.7% military. At that time there were 13 single-engine aircraft based at this airport.

References

External links
 
 

Airports in Kentucky
Transportation in Crittenden County, Kentucky
Buildings and structures in Crittenden County, Kentucky